Museum Venanzo Crocetti is a contemporary art museum dedicated to the work of the Italian sculptor Venanzo Crocetti (1913–2003).

The museum is located in Rome at Via Cassia, 492.

History 
The museum is housed in the building that originally was the main studio of the sculptor.

Organisation 
Venanzo Crocetti Museum preserved over a hundred bronzes, marbles, paintings, works on paper and documents that span a period of time ranging from 1930 to 1998.

Venanzo Crocetti works are in Rome, Brussels, Paris, Bern, Zurich, New York, San Paolo of Brazil, Montreal, Tokyo and Osaka. In 1991, in Saint Petersburg, the Hermitage Museum has dedicated to the Venanzio Crocetti work a permanent exhibition.

The Museum Venanzo Crocetti also houses selected contemporary art exhibitions.

References

 Ralf van Bühren: Kunst und Kirche im 20. Jahrhundert. Die Rezeption des Zweiten Vatikanischen Konzils (Konziliengeschichte, Reihe B: Untersuchungen). Paderborn: Ferdinand Schöningh 2008

External links

Web gallery of Venanzio Crocetti sculpture
 

Art museums and galleries in Rome
Contemporary art galleries in Italy